The League of British Jews was an Anglo-Jewish anti-Zionist organization that opposed the Balfour Declaration giving British support for the establishment of a Jewish homeland in Palestine.

The League was founded in November 1917 by a group of prominent British Jews that included Lionel Nathan de Rothschild, Sir Philip Magnus and Louis Montagu, 2nd Baron Swaythling. Its first president was Rothschild, with Montagu and Magnus serving as vice presidents. The League had a small membership, only 18 in 1917, who were "recruited from the highly acculturated upper strata of British Jewry." Despite its small numbers, the League was highly influential. It folded in 1929.

The League favored settlement in Palestine by British Jews who chose to live there, but opposed the belief that Jews constituted a separate nationality, the position then held by Reform Judaism. At the time it was founded, the objectives of the League were listed as upholding "the status of British Jews holding the Jewish religion," to "resist the allegation that Jews constitute a separate nationality," and "to facilitate the settlement in Palestine of such Jews as may desire to make Palestine their home." Membership was available to all at a cost of one shilling per year.

The views of the League were reflected in a newspaper founded in October 1919, the Jewish Guardian, edited by Laurie Magnus. Its aim was to provide an alternative to the pro-Zionist Jewish Chronicle and Jewish World.

See also 
American Council for Judaism
Balfour Declaration
Zionism

References

Jewish organisations based in the United Kingdom
Jewish anti-Zionism in the United Kingdom
Jewish anti-Zionist organizations
Jewish organizations established in the 1910s